Kinky boots are boots, usually thigh-high boots, associated with boot fetishism.

Kinky Boots may also refer to:
 Kinky Boots (film), a 2005 British film
 Kinky Boots (musical), a 2012 American musical, based on the 2005 film
 Kinky Boots (Broadway cast album), a cast album from the musical
 "Kinky Boots" (song), a 1964 song
"Kinky Boots", a 2017 Irish rebel song by The Irish Brigade (a parody of "Brand New Key" by Melanie)